Ulla-Britt Wieslander (later Rosberg, born 10 June 1942) is a retired Swedish sprinter. She competed at the 1960, 1964 and 1968 Summer Olympics in the 100 m, 200 m and 80 m hurdles (five events in total), but failed to reach the final in any contest. Between 1959 and 1966 she won more than 20 national titles in the 80 m hurdles, 100 m, 200 m, 4 × 100 m and 4 × 200 m events.

References

1942 births
Living people
Swedish female sprinters
Olympic athletes of Sweden
Athletes (track and field) at the 1960 Summer Olympics
Athletes (track and field) at the 1964 Summer Olympics
Athletes (track and field) at the 1968 Summer Olympics
Olympic female sprinters
People from Borås
Sportspeople from Västra Götaland County